Ottaviano de' Medici (11 July 1484 – 28 May 1546) was an Italian politician. He was the ancestor of the Princes of Ottajano line of the Medici family.

From a minor branch of the Medici family, he gained prominence through his marriage to Francesca Salviati, a granddaughter of Lorenzo de' Medici and Ottaviano's own distant cousin.

He held several important positions in Florence, including that of Gonfaloniere di Giustizia, although now a merely formal one after the suppression of the Republic by the Spanish troops in 1530. He was also Senator from 1532. He was trusted by Alessandro de' Medici with administrating the family's Tuscan estates.

His son Alessandro was cardinal and, from 1605, pope as Leo XI. His other son Bernadetto founded the southern Italian line of the family by acquiring the seigniory of Ottaviano, near Naples.

References

1484 births
1546 deaths
Ottaviano
16th-century Italian nobility
Italian politicians